Triangle Lake is a very small lake in northwestern Ontario, Canada. It is located between Dryden and Kenora, Ontario. It can be seen from the Trans-Canada Highway on the north side. In late June, 2009, it was the site of road construction. Triangle lake has recently been discovered to be acidified. It is a major concern.

See also
List of lakes in Ontario

Lakes of Kenora District